WRO may refer to:

 WROSIV also known as Wro 
 World Robot Olympiad
 Copernicus Airport Wrocław in Poland (IATA airport code)
 World Regenesis Organization from Dirge of Cerberus: Final Fantasy VII and Final Fantasy VII Advent Children
 Western Rite Orthodoxy